Military deployment is the movement of armed forces and their logistical support infrastructure around the world.

See also
 Deployments of the French military
 Pakistan Armed Forces deployments
 United States military deployments
 Rapid Deployment Force

 
Military terminology
deployment